The Coal Run Subdivision is a railroad line owned by CSX Transportation in the U.S. State of Kentucky. At its west end the line continues east from the Big Sandy Subdivision and at its east end the line comes to an end. The Winns Branch branches off of the Coal Run Subdivision

See also
 List of CSX Transportation lines

References

CSX Transportation lines
Transportation in Pike County, Kentucky